The Kartvelian studies also referred as Kartvelology or Georgian studies  is a field of humanities covering Kartvelian (Georgian) history, languages, religion and/or culture.

In a narrower sense, the term usually refers to the research activities conducted on these problems outside Georgia.

Luminaries of Kartvelian studies

Georgian scholars 
Prince Teimuraz of Georgia (1782–1846)
David Chubinashvili (1814–1891)
Alexander Khakhanov (1864–1912)
Ivane Javakhishvili (1876–1940)
Korneli Kekelidze (1879–1962)
Ilia Abuladze (1901–1968)
Simon Kaukhchishvili (1895–1981)
Giorgi Melikishvili (1918–2002)
Irine Melikishvili (1943–2013)
Georges Charachidzé (1930–2010)
Merab Chukhua (born 1964)

International scholars 
Jacob Georg Christian Adler (1756-1834)
Marie-Félicité Brosset (1802–1880)
Arthur Leist (1852–1927)
John Oliver Wardrop (1864–1948)
Marjory Wardrop (1869–1909)
Robert Pierpont Blake (1886–1950)
Gerhard Deeters (1892–1961)
Georges Dumézil (1898–1986)
William Edward David Allen (1901–1973)
Hans Vogt (1909–1986)
Gertrud Pätsch (1910-1994)
Cyril Toumanoff (1913–1997)
Gérard Garitte (1914–1992)
David Marshall Lang (1924–1991)
Georgi Klimov (1928–1997)
Michel Van Esbroeck (1934–2003)
 Heinz Fähnrich (born 1941)
Kevin Tuite (born 1954)
Donald Rayfield
Brian George Hewitt (born 1949)
Stephen H. Rapp
Stephen F. Jones
Constantine B. Lerner
Mine Kadiroğlu
Luigi Magarotto
Bernard Outtier
Farshid Delshad (born 1972)
Jost Gippert
Roland Bielmeier
Michael Job
Katharine Vivian (1917–2010)
Hirotake Maeda
Hayate Sotome 
Václav A. Černý

Periodicals 
Bedi Kartlisa. Revue de Kartvélologie
Georgica
Revue des études géorgiennes et caucasiennes

External links 
Fund for Kartvelian Studies 
Khintibidze, Elguja (1996), Georgian Literature in European Scholarship. NATO Research Fellowships 1994-1996.

 
European studies
Cultural studies